The International Academy of Quantum Molecular Science (IAQMS) is an international scientific learned society covering all applications of quantum theory to chemistry and chemical physics. It was created in Menton in 1967. The founding members were Raymond Daudel, Per-Olov Löwdin, Robert G. Parr, John Pople and Bernard Pullman. Its foundation was supported by Louis de Broglie.

Originally, the Academy had 25 regular members under 65 years of age. This was later raised to 30, and then to 35. There is no limit on the number of members over 65 years of age. The members are "chosen among the scientists of all countries who have distinguished themselves by the value of their scientific work, their role of pioneer or leader of a school in the broad field of quantum chemistry, i.e. the application of quantum mechanics to the study of molecules and macromolecules". As of 2006, the Academy consisted of 90 members. The Academy organizes the International Congress of Quantum Chemistry every three years.

The academy awards a medal to a young member of the scientific community who has distinguished themselves by a pioneering and important contribution. The award has been made every year since 1967.

Presidents

Members  

Ali Alavi
Millard H. Alexander
Jean-Marie André
Evert-Jan Baerends
Vincenzo Barone
Rodney J. Bartlett
Mikhail V. Basilevsky
Axel D. Becke
Joel M. Bowman 
Jean-Luc Brédas
Ria Broer-Braam
A. David Buckingham
Kieron Burke
Petr Cársky
Emily A. Carter
Lorenz S. Cederbaum
David M. Ceperley
Garnet Kin-Lic Chan
Jiří Čížek
David Clary
Enrico Clementi
Ernest R. Davidson
Wolfgang Domcke
Thom Dunning
Michel Dupuis
Odile Eisenstein
Jiali Gao
Jürgen Gauß
Peter Gill
William A. Goddard, III
Leticia González
Mark S. Gordon
Stefan Grimme
George G. Hall
Sharon Hammes-Schiffer
Martin Head-Gordon
Trygve Helgaker
Eric J. Heller
Kimihiko Hirao
So Hirata
Roald Hoffmann
Kendall N. Houk

Bogumil Jeziorski
Poul Jørgensen
William L. Jorgensen
Joshua Jortner
Martin Karplus
Kwang S. Kim
Wim Klopper
Peter Knowles
Ronnie Kosloff
Georg Kresse
Anna Krylov
Werner Kutzelnigg
Roland Lefebvre
William A. Lester
Raphael D. Levine
Mel Levy
Shuhua Li
Jan Erik Linderberg
Wenjian Liu
Jean-Claude Lorquet
Nancy Makri
Jean-Paul Malrieu
David E. Manolopoulos
Rudolph A. Marcus
Todd J. Martinez
Roy McWeeny
Benedetta Mennucci
Wilfried E. Meyer
Josef Michl
William H. Miller
Debashis Mukherjee
Saburo Nagakura
Shigeru Nagase
Hiroshi Nakatsuji
Frank Neese
Willem C. Nieuwpoort
Evgueni E. Nikitin
Jozef Noga
Marcel Nooijen
Christian Ochsenfeld
Jeppe Olsen
Josef Paldus

Michele Parrinello
Ruben Pauncz
John P. Perdew
Sigrid D. Peyerimhoff
Piotr Piecuch
Peter Pulay
Pekka Pyykkö
Leo Radom
Krishnan Raghavachari
Mark A. Ratner
Julia Rice
Michael A. Robb
Clemens C. J. Roothaan
Ursula Röthlisberger
Klaus Ruedenberg
Lionel Salem
Trond Saue
Andreas Savin
Henry F. Schaefer, III
George C. Schatz
H. Bernhard Schlegel
Peter Schwerdtfeger
Gustavo E. Scuseria
Sason Shaik
Zhigang Shuai
Per E. M. Siegbahn
John F. Stanton
Krzysztof Szalewicz
Seiichiro Ten-no
Walter Thiel
Jacopo Tomasi
Donald G. Truhlar
John Tully
Miroslav Urban
Ad van der Avoird
Alain Veillard
Luuk Visscher
Gregory Voth
Arieh Warshel
Hans-Joachim Werner
Weitao Yang
Rudolf Zahradnik

Deceased members 
 Reinhart Ahlrichs
 David R. Bates
 S. Francis Boys
 Louis de Broglie
 Charles A. Coulson
 David P. Craig
 Alexander Dalgarno
 Raymond Daudel
 Alexander S. Davydov
 Michael J. S. Dewar
 Henry Eyring
 Inga Fischer-Hjalmars
 Vladimir Aleksandrovich Fock
 Kenichi Fukui
 Rezsö Gaspar
 Nicholas C. Handy
 Hermann Hartmann
 Edgar Heilbronner

 Walter Heitler
 Gerhard Herzberg
 Joseph O. Hirschfelder
 Erich Hückel
 Friedrich Hund
 Michael Kasha
 Shigeki Kato
Walter Kohn
 Wlodzimierz Kolos
 Masao Kotani
 Jaroslav Koutecky
 John C. Light
 William N. Lipscomb 
 H. Christopher Longuet-Higgins
 Per-Olov Löwdin
 Frederick A. Matsen
 Harden M. McConnell
 Keiji Morokuma

 Robert S. Mulliken
 Robert G. Parr
 Linus Pauling
 John Pople
 Alberte Pullman
 Bernard Pullman
 Björn Olof Roos
 Camille Sandorfy
 Paul von Rague Schleyer
 Eolo Scrocco
 Isaiah Shavitt
 Massimo Simonetta
 John C. Slater
 Au-chin Tang
 Edward Teller
 John H. Van Vleck
 E. Bright Wilson
 Tom Ziegler

References

External links
Official website

Chemistry education
Organizations established in 1967
Quantum chemistry
Molecular physics
International academies
International scientific organizations